Berzeliustinden is a mountain in Wedel Jarlsberg Land in Spitsbergen, Svalbard. It has a height of 1,211 m.a.s.l. It is located south of Van Keulenfjorden, and is included in the Sør-Spitsbergen National Park.

The mountain is named after Swedish chemist Jöns Jacob Berzelius.

See also
 Berzeliusdalen

References

Mountains of Spitsbergen